Thalassery Stadium (also known as Thalassery Municipal Cricket Ground) is located near the Thalassery Civil Station, Kerala state, South India. Thalassery Stadium hosts the Ranji Trophy cricket matches every year.

History
On this ground, the first ball was bowled in the early 19th century, thanks to Colonel Arthur Wellesley, who brought the game to this Malabar town. In 2002, Thalassery cricket ground celebrated its 200th birthday by hosting a one-day cricket match between India and Sri Lanka sides containing former Test players.

See also
Thalassery Pier
Thalassery Fort
Overbury's folly
Thalassery

References

Sports venues in Kerala
Buildings and structures in Thalassery
Cricket grounds in Kerala
Sports venues completed in 1802
1802 establishments in India